The Duckbill oceanic eel (Nessorhamphus ingolfianus, also known as the Duckbilled eel or the Ingolf duckbill eel) is an eel in the family Derichthyidae (longneck eels). It was described by Johannes Schmidt in 1912. It is a marine, deep water-dwelling eel which is known from France, Morocco, the Cape of Good Hope, and South Africa in the eastern Atlantic Ocean, as well as from the western Atlantic, southwestern Indian, and southwestern Pacific. It dwells at a depth range of 0–1800 metres, inhabiting the mesopelagic zone.

The Duckbill oceanic eel feeds primarily on crustaceans.

References

Derichthyidae
Taxa named by Johannes Schmidt (biologist)
Fish described in 1912